Halenia is a genus of recent discorbacean foraminifera. It contains only one species, Halenia legrandi The test is free, a low trochspire with a rounded periphery; wall calcareous, monolamellar. Chambers are subglobular, all visible on spiral side, only last volution visible on umbilical side; final chamber with an umbilical flap. Sutures are depressed, radial on umbilical side, curved to sinuate on spiral side, with sutural slits on both sides.

References 

 A. R. Loeblich and H. Tappan, 1964. Sarcodina Chiefly "Thecamoebians" and Foraminiferida; Treatise on Invertebrate Paleontology, Part C Protista 2. Geological Society of America, Boulder, Colo. 
 A. R. Loeblich and H. Tappan, 1988. Forminiferal Genera and their Classification. Van Nostrand Reinhold.

Taxa described in 1980